J. R. Ramirez is a Cuban-American actor. He is best known for his series regular role of Detective Jared Vasquez on the NBC/Netflix series Manifest. Prior, he was a series regular as Julio on the Starz series Power and as Oscar Arocho on the Netflix/Marvel Studios series Jessica Jones. Ramirez also played Ted Grant / Wildcat in a recurring role in the third season of Arrow.

Early life
Ramirez was born in Matanzas, Cuba. When he was a baby, his family moved to the United States and he was raised in Tampa, Florida.

Career
Ramirez played a recurring character on the first season of Power before being promoted to a regular cast member in the second season. He followed up by having a recurring appearance as Ted Grant / Wildcat on the third season of Arrow, before joining the second season of Jessica Jones as Oscar Arocho. In February 2018, Ramirez was cast as Detective Jared Vasquez in the NBC series Manifest.

Filmography

References

External links
 
 

1980 births
Cuban emigrants to the United States
People from Matanzas
21st-century American male actors
21st-century Cuban male actors
American male film actors
American male television actors
Cuban male film actors
Cuban male television actors
Living people
Male actors from Tampa, Florida